|}

The Oh So Sharp Stakes is a Group 3 flat horse race in Great Britain open to two-year-old fillies. It is run on the Rowley Mile at Newmarket over a distance of 7 furlongs (1,408 metres), and it is scheduled to take place each year in October.

History
The event is named after Oh So Sharp, a Newmarket-trained winner of the fillies' Triple Crown in 1985. It was established in 1987, and it was initially an ungraded conditions race. It was given Listed status in 1993, and promoted to Group 3 level in 2007.

The race was previously held on the second day of Newmarket's three-day Cambridgeshire Meeting, the day before the Cambridgeshire Handicap, but was moved to a fixture a week later in 2014. From 2015 it was moved back a further week to become part of the Future Champions Festival at Newmarket.

Records

Leading jockey (4 wins):
 Richard Hills – Hiwaya (1994), Sarayir (1996), Khulood (2002), Tabassum (2009)

Leading trainer (6 wins):
 Sir Michael Stoute – Arsaan (1988), Dartrey (1990), Lilium (2000), Top Romance (2003), Tabassum (2009), Havant (2010)

Winners

See also
 Horse racing in Great Britain
 List of British flat horse races

References
 Racing Post:

 galopp-sieger.de – Oh So Sharp Stakes.
 ifhaonline.org – International Federation of Horseracing Authorities – Oh So Sharp Stakes (2019).
 pedigreequery.com – Oh So Sharp Stakes – Newmarket.

Flat races in Great Britain
Newmarket Racecourse
Flat horse races for two-year-old fillies
Recurring sporting events established in 1987
1987 establishments in England